"Something to Live For" is a 1939 jazz composition by Billy Strayhorn. It was the first collaboration between Strayhorn and Duke Ellington and became the first of many Strayhorn compositions to be recorded by Ellington's orchestra. The song was based on a poem Strayhorn had written as a teenager. According to an all-day tribute to Strayhorn on KCSM radio on 29 November 2008—Strayhorn's birthday—Strayhorn began working on this tune in 1933 when he was 18.

The song has been recorded many times, by Ellington, Lena Horne, Ella Fitzgerald, Nina Simone, Carmen McRae, Tony Bennett, Johnny Mathis, Mel Torme and many others. Fitzgerald has called it her favorite song.

See also
List of 1930s jazz standards

References

External links
Review of Something to Live For: The Music of Billy Strayhorn (Oxford University Press, 2002)
Something to Live For at Google Books

1939 songs
Songs with music by Billy Strayhorn
Jazz songs
1930s jazz standards
Lena Horne songs
Songs with music by Duke Ellington
Jazz compositions in B-flat major